Smorgon may refer to the following:

People
 David Smorgon (born 1947), Australian businessman, President of the Western Bulldogs football club
 Graham Smorgon, Australian businessman, former President of the Carlton Football Club
 Loti Smorgon (1919–2013), Australian philanthropist
 Victor Smorgon (1913–2009), Australian industrialist

Places
 Smarhon' (Smorgon), a city in Belarus
 Smarhon Air Base, a Soviet Air Force base in Belarus

Organisations
 FC Smorgon, a Belarusian football club 
 Smorgon Steel, a former Australian steel manufacturing business